Shek Ngau Chau is an uninhabited island of Hong Kong within Tai Po District.

Buildings
The island features a light beacon, a pier, a one-storey hut and stairs to the peak. They were built by the Marine Department as aids to navigation.

Conservation
The island is the most important breeding ground for terns in Hong Kong. It was designated as a Site of Special Scientific Interest in 2005.

References

Uninhabited islands of Hong Kong
Tai Po District
Islands of Hong Kong